Christos Poyiatzis (born 12 April 1978) is a Cypriot football coach and a former midfielder.

Club career
He was the captain of Ethnikos Achna and has played at the club his entire career, becoming one of the longest-serving one-club men in football.

External links

 
 
 

1978 births
Living people
Cypriot footballers
Cyprus international footballers
Cyprus under-21 international footballers
Cyprus youth international footballers
Association football midfielders
Ethnikos Achna FC players
Cypriot First Division players
People from Famagusta
Cypriot football managers